Oda al Gato (Ode to the Cat) is a poem by the Chilean poet and Nobel laureate, Pablo Neruda from his book "Navegaciones y regresos" (Voyages and Homecomings) that was first published in Buenos Aires, Argentina by Losada in 1959. The ode that celebrates the obscure nature of cats has been translated by many scholars including Ken Krabbenhoft. 

Neruda’s  “Ode to the cat” poem has been used in Jazz music festivals and was also used in the Poetry in Motion project in New York City; where public trains and buses carried verses of selected poems, on spaces normally reserved for commercial advertisement.

External links
 University of Chile, Ode to the Cat
 Ode to the Cat

Pablo Neruda
Cats in literature
1959 poems